Scott M. Sassa is an American entertainment executive who has held a number of high-level executive positions in large entertainment companies.  Sassa is currently chairman of MILK Makeup.

Biography

Early career
Early in his career, Sassa was vice president of New Business Development at Ohlmeyer Communications Co., which was  headed by Don Ohlmeyer.  He also served as vice president of network management for the Fox Broadcasting Company. Sassa was among the first people hired by Fox and he ran its operations and administration departments.

Turner Broadcasting
Sassa spent nine years at Turner Broadcasting System, finishing his tenure as president of Turner Entertainment Group and a member of Turner's board of directors and TBS's executive committee.

Sassa joined Turner Broadcasting in 1982, first as director of Sales promotion, then executive producer of Night Tracks in 1983 which led to him becoming vice president and general manager of the company's Cable Music Channel in 1984. He began his career with Rogers & Cowan public relations agency.

Sassa is credited with building Turner's entertainment cable channels into industry leaders, launching seven networks over a seven-year period – including three of the top five rated basic cable networks. From 1992 to 1996, he was responsible for all operations and programming for TBS Superstation, Turner Network Television, Cartoon Network, Turner Classic Movies and Turner's international entertainment networks in Europe, Asia and Latin America.

Sassa recruited Amy Pascal to start up Turner Pictures, a feature film production company that developed and produced You've Got Mail, Any Given Sunday and Gettysburg. Sassa was also responsible for Turner Home Video, Turner Licensing and Merchandising, Turner Publishing, Turner New Media, Turner Original Productions and Hanna-Barbera Cartoons Inc. Sassa was named executive vice president of Turner Network Television in 1988, where he was instrumental in the network's launch, the largest at that time.

After Turner, Sassa was president and chief operating officer of Andrews Group, a unit of MacAndrews & Forbes Holding, and the chief executive officer of Marvel Entertainment.

NBC
Sassa joined NBC in September 1997 as president of the NBC Television Stations division.  In this position, he was responsible for overseeing the operation of NBC's 13 owned-and-operated television stations.

From May 1999, Sassa served as president of NBC West Coast, responsible for overseeing all of NBC's entertainment-related businesses and reported to Bob Wright, chairman and chief executive officer, NBC. Sassa made the transition to that position after working with his predecessor, Don Ohlmeyer, and serving as president of NBC Entertainment since October 1998. During this time, he oversaw the development and production of NBC's new primetime series, including such shows as The West Wing, Freaks and Geeks, Law & Order: Special Victims Unit and Fear Factor. Under Sassa, NBC was the number-one network three out of four seasons.

Friendster

From 2004 to 2005, Sassa served as president and CEO of Friendster, a top 50 Internet site that pioneered social networking. Friendster was backed by Kleiner Perkins and Benchmark Capital.  After Friendster, he served as Residence with Kleiner Perkins, a leading technology venture capital firm.

Hearst
Sassa joined Hearst in 2008, where he was president of Hearst Entertainment & Syndication, the operating group responsible for Hearst's interests in cable television networks, including ESPN, Lifetime, A&E and History; television production and distribution; newspaper syndication; and merchandise licensing. In February 2013 Hearst Ventures became part of the Entertainment & syndication group. He left Hearst after executives became aware of an extortion plot involving a stripper with whom he was sexting.

El Rey Network
Sassa was vice chairman of El Rey Network, a new US cable network founded by director Robert Rodriguez, from 2013–2015.

References

External links 
 

American television executives
NBCUniversal people
NBC executives
Presidents of NBC Entertainment
NBC West Coast Presidents
Fox Broadcasting Company executives
Living people
American people of Japanese descent
Year of birth missing (living people)